Senator Taitano may refer to:

Kelly Marsh Taitano (born 1964), Senate of Guam
Richard Taitano (1921–1997), Senate of Guam